Lisa Campbell (born 1 May 1968) is an Australian badminton player, born in Frankston, Victoria. She competed in women's singles and mixed doubles at the 1996 Summer Olympics in Atlanta.

References

External links

1968 births
Living people
Australian female badminton players
Olympic badminton players of Australia
Badminton players at the 1996 Summer Olympics
Commonwealth Games medallists in badminton
Commonwealth Games gold medallists for Australia
Badminton players at the 1994 Commonwealth Games
People from Frankston, Victoria
Sportspeople from Melbourne
Sportswomen from Victoria (Australia)
Medallists at the 1994 Commonwealth Games